Elissa Knight (born April 15, 1975) is an American employee at Pixar and voice actress. As a voice actress, her first major role was in the 2006 film Cars as one of the twins known as Tia and as Eve in WALL-E 2008.

Biography

Knight was born in Santa Cruz, California. As a Pixar employee, she worked on numerous films, including Cars, Ratatouille, and WALL-E. Knight voices animated characters as necessary, occasionally recording scratch tracks for use until a big-name actor can record their dialogue. She had her first voice role in the 2006 film Cars as Tia, one of two identical twin Mazda Miata "sisters" who become fans of several of the race cars (the other is played by Lindsey Collins; both actors work at Pixar as assistants).

Knight continued to do voice acting in WALL-E. In WALL-E, she plays EVE (Extraterrestrial Vegetation Evaluator), a futuristic robot who descends to Earth in search of any life, specifically plants, that still exist in the 29th century. Knight stated that she had never read the script for WALL-E and made few preparations. Her recorded dialogue was originally meant to be a placeholder while the casting department looked for an actress that would voice the part, but the producers liked her performance enough to use it in the finished film.

Filmography

Film

Television

Video games

References

External links

Elissa Knight hollywood.com

1975 births
21st-century American actresses
American film actresses
American voice actresses
Living people
Actresses from Santa Cruz, California
Pixar people